Eureka Tower is a  skyscraper located in the Southbank precinct of Melbourne, Victoria, Australia. Construction began in August 2002 and the exterior was completed on 1 June 2006. The plaza was finished in June 2006 and the building was officially opened on 11 October 2006. The project was designed by Melbourne architectural firm Fender Katsalidis Architects and was built by Grocon (Grollo Australia). The developer of the tower was Eureka Tower Pty Ltd, a joint venture consisting of Daniel Grollo (Grocon), investor Tab Fried and one of the Tower's architects Nonda Katsalidis. It was the world's tallest residential tower when measured to its highest floor, until surpassed by Ocean Heights and the HHHR Tower in Dubai. From 2006 to 2019, it was the tallest building in Melbourne, until the topping out of Australia 108. It is currently the third tallest building in Australia, behind the Q1 in Queensland and Australia 108, as well as the second tallest to roof (excluding spire) behind the latter skyscraper. As of 2016 it was the 15th tallest residential building in the world.

Design and features

Eureka Tower is named after the Eureka Stockade, a rebellion during the Victorian gold rush in 1854. This has been incorporated into the design, with the building's gold crown representing the gold rush and a red stripe representing the blood spilt during the revolt. The blue glass cladding that covers most of the building represents the blue background of the stockade's flag and the white lines also represent the Eureka Stockade flag. The white horizontal stripes also represent markings on a surveyor's measuring staff.

At the base of the tower is an art installation containing bees inside a white box, resembling a manmade beehive. There are two regular sized bees outside the box, and one queen bee on the top. The gold colour of the bees complements the gold at the top of the tower. The installation was created by Richard Stringer and Nonda Katsalidis, and was complete in December 2007.

When measured either by the height of its roof, or by the height of its highest habitable floor, Eureka Tower was the tallest residential building in the world when completed. It was also the building with the most floors available for residential occupancy in the world. The building stands  in height, with 91 storeys above ground plus one basement level. At the time of its completion, it was one of the only buildings in the world with 90 or more storeys. It is also the third-tallest building in Australia and the second tallest building in Melbourne, behind Australia 108 which topped out in November 2019. The single level basement and first 9 floors contain car parking. The building's proximity to the water table as well as the Yarra River made the construction of a basement car park uneconomical. In all, there are 84 floors of apartments (including some floors shared between car parking and apartments), with the remainder being used for building facilities and the observation deck.

According to the ranking system developed by the U.S.-based Council on Tall Buildings and Urban Habitat, the Eureka Tower qualified as the tallest building in three of the four categories in which heights are ranked, namely height to the floor of the highest occupied floor of the building. However, the spire attached to the top of Q1 exceeds the Eureka Tower in the other two categories, namely "Height to the tip of spire, pinnacle, antenna, mast or flag pole" –  in this case, spire – and height to architectural top of the building.

Specifications
 556 apartments
 13 lifts travelling up to 
  of windows
 3,680 stairs
  of concrete
  of reinforced steel
 Building weighs 

Floors 82 to 87, marketed as Summit Levels, contain only one apartment per floor, each with an original price of A$7 million for the unfurnished floor space alone.

The highest floors of the tower house an observation deck (level 88), restaurant (level 89), communication rooms and balcony (90) and water tanks (90 and 91). A system of pumps constantly moves water between the two 300,000-litre tanks to counteract wind-induced oscillations.

Observation deck (Melbourne Skydeck) 
It opened to the public on 15 May 2007. An entry fee applies to access the Skydeck.

The Skydeck features twenty viewfinders that help visitors to pinpoint numerous significant landmarks around all parts of Melbourne, along with several free binoculars. There is a small outside area called The Terrace which is closed in high winds. There is also a glass cube called The Edge, which extends itself 3 meters from the building to hang over the edge of the tower and add to the viewing experience.

On 10 January 2005, Grocon, the firm building Eureka Tower, proposed adding a  communications mast/observation tower. The proposal is currently before the local planning commission. This mast would be a significant structure, used for providing an adventure climb to the tip of the summit.

The proposed structure may also include a communications tower.

The Edge
When one enters, the glass is opaque as the cube moves out over the edge of the building. Once fully extended over the edge, the glass becomes clear.

Eureka 89 Dining & Events 
Located on the top floor (level 89) of the Eureka Tower, Eureka 89 Dining & Events is a restaurant, cocktail bar and event space offering a modern Australian menu by award winning chef Renee Martillano. Eureka 89's location on the towers top floor make's it the southern hemisphere highest restaurant & bar at a staggering 292.3m (959 ft) metres high.

Construction 

Construction began August 2002 and took 4 years and 2 months.

The tower was built using reinforced concrete using a slipform method. Eureka Tower's lift core superseded the height of Rialto Towers on 9 November 2004.

On 23 May 2006, the crane on top of the tower was dismantled by a smaller crane, which was dismantled by a smaller crane that could be taken down the service elevator.

Eureka Tower has 24 carat (99.9%) gold plated glass windows on the top 10 floors of the building.  Installation of the gold glass was completed in March 2006.  Apartment owners and tenants had taken up residence in the building between Ground Level and Level 80 as of July 2006.

On 11 October 2006, the tower was officially opened by then Premier of Victoria, Steve Bracks.

Construction methods 
A 2-floor Grocon-Lubeca jumpform system was used to halve work time, concrete and joints required in the core, as well as increasing structural integrity.

Grocon purchased the Singapore company Lubeca in 2000, and then did more R&D to design the 2-floor jumpform system.

Eureka Climb
Since 2012 the Eureka Climb event has been held annually. Participants climb 1642 steps to the observation deck. The current record is 7 minutes to climb up 88 floors.

Air plant experiment
From June 2013, a team of researchers placed Tillandsia airplants on four locations on the tower. Two different species were placed at four levels: 56, 65, 91, and on top at level 92. Not all plants survived. Those on eastern aspects died because of lack of rain. However, plants in the most exposed sites, facing west and on the open roof sites have survived and flourished. The plants have been regularly checked over a number of years (last check Dec 2021) and have grown into resilient colonies. As far as can be ascertained this is the highest building with plants on and the experiment paved the way for utilising Tillandsia on high-rise buildings.

Gallery

See also

 List of tallest buildings in Melbourne
 List of tallest buildings in Australia
 Australia 108

References

External links
 Eureka Tower Observation Deck Website
 Eureka Tower on CTBUH Skyscraper Center
 Eureka Tower apartments 
 Emporis Page
 Eureka Tower, Melbourne, Victoria - Design Build Network
 

Skyscrapers in Melbourne
Residential skyscrapers in Australia
Residential buildings completed in 2006
Apartment buildings in Melbourne
Modernist architecture in Australia
2006 establishments in Australia
Buildings and structures in the City of Melbourne (LGA)
Southbank, Victoria